Ellen Baker may refer to:
 Ellen S. Baker (born 1953), American physician and NASA astronaut
 Ellen Harding Baker (1847–1886), American astronomer and teacher
 Ellen Baker (actress), who starred in the 2005 science-fiction film The Wild Blue Yonder

 Ellen Baker (fictional tutor), a character featured in the 2016–2019 edition of New Horizon, a widely-used Japanese textbook for teaching English to middle-school students